Montonen–Olive duality or electric–magnetic duality is the oldest known example of strong–weak duality or S-duality according to current terminology. It generalizes the electro-magnetic symmetry of Maxwell's equations by stating that magnetic monopoles, which are usually viewed as emergent quasiparticles that are "composite" (i.e. they are solitons or topological defects), can in fact be viewed as "elementary" quantized particles with electrons playing the reverse role of "composite" topological solitons; the viewpoints are equivalent and the situation dependent on the duality. It was later proven to hold true when dealing with a N = 4 supersymmetric Yang–Mills theory. It is named after Finnish physicist Claus Montonen and British physicist David Olive after they proposed the idea in their academic paper Magnetic monopoles as gauge particles? where they state:

S-duality is now a basic ingredient in topological quantum field theories and string theories, especially since the 1990s with the advent of the second superstring revolution. This duality is now one of several in string theory, the AdS/CFT correspondence which gives rise to the holographic principle, being viewed as amongst the most important. These dualities have played an important role in condensed matter physics, from predicting fractional charges of the electron, to the discovery of the magnetic monopole.

Electric–magnetic duality 
The idea of a close similarity between electricity and magnetism, going back to the time of André-Marie Ampère and Michael Faraday, was first made more precise with James Clerk Maxwell's formulation of his famous equations for a unified theory of electric and magnetic fields:

 

In 1931 Paul Dirac was studying the quantum mechanics of an electric charge moving in a magnetic monopole field, he found he could only consistently define the wavefunction if the electric charge  and magnetic charge  satisfy the quantization condition:

 

Note that from the above if just one monopole of some charge  exists anywhere, then all electric charges must be multiples of the unit . This would "explain" why the magnitude of the electron charge and proton charge should be exactly equal and are the same no matter what electron or proton we are considering, a fact known to hold true to one part in 1021. This led Dirac to state:

The magnetic monopole line of research took a step forward in 1974 when Gerard 't Hooft and Alexander Markovich Polyakov independently constructed monopoles not as quantized point particles, but as solitons, in a  Yang–Mills–Higgs system, previously magnetic monopoles had always included a point singularity. The subject was motivated by Nielsen–Olesen vortices.

At weak coupling, the electrically and magnetically charged objects look very different: one an electron point particle that is weakly coupled and the other a monopole soliton that is strongly coupled. The magnetic fine structure constant is roughly the reciprocal of the usual one: 

In 1977 Claus Montonen and David Olive conjectured that at strong coupling the situation would be reversed: the electrically charged objects would be strongly coupled and have non-singular cores, while the magnetically charged objects would become weakly coupled and point like. The strongly coupled theory would be equivalent to weakly coupled theory in which the basic quanta carried magnetic rather than electric charges. In subsequent work this conjecture was refined by Ed Witten and David Olive, they showed that in a supersymmetric extension of the Georgi–Glashow model, the  supersymmetric version (N is the number of conserved supersymmetries), there were no quantum corrections to the classical mass spectrum and the calculation of the exact masses could be obtained. The problem related to the monopole's unit spin remained for this  case, but soon after a solution to it was obtained for the case of  supersymmetry: Hugh Osborn was able to show that when spontaneous symmetry breaking is imposed in the N = 4 supersymmetric gauge theory, the spins of the topological monopole states are identical to those of the massive gauge particles.

Dual Gravity 
In 1979–1980, Montonen–Olive duality motivated developing mixed symmetric higher-spin Curtright field. For the spin-2 case, the gauge-transformation dynamics of Curtright field is dual to graviton in D>4 spacetime. Meanwhile, the spin-0 field, developed by Curtright–Freund, is dual to the Freund-Nambu field, that is coupled to the trace of its energy–momentum tensor.

A massive spin-2 dual gravity, to lowest order, in D = 4 and N-D is recently introduced as a theory dual to the massive gravity of Ogievetsky–Polubarinov theory. The dual field is coupled to the curl of the energy momentum tensor.

Mathematical formalism 
In a four-dimensional Yang–Mills theory with N = 4 supersymmetry, which is the case where the Montonen–Olive duality applies, one obtains a physically equivalent theory if one replaces the gauge coupling constant g by 1/g. This also involves an interchange of the electrically charged particles and magnetic monopoles. See also Seiberg duality.

In fact, there exists a larger SL(2,Z) symmetry where both g as well as theta-angle are transformed non-trivially.

The gauge coupling and theta-angle can be combined to form one complex coupling 
 
Since the theta-angle is periodic, there is a symmetry 
 
The quantum mechanical theory with gauge group G (but not the classical theory, except in the case when the G is abelian) is also invariant under the symmetry
 
In the case the theta-angle is 0, this reduces to the simple form of Montonen–Olive duality stated above.

Philosophical implications 
The Montonen–Olive duality throws into question the idea that we can obtain a full theory of physics by reducing things into their "fundamental" parts. The philosophy of reductionism states that if we understand the "fundamental" or "elementary" parts of a system we can then deduce all the properties of the system as a whole. Duality says that there is no physically measurable property that can deduce what is fundamental and what is not, the notion of what is elementary and what is composite is merely relative, acting as a kind of gauge symmetry. This seems to favour the view of emergentism, as both the Noether charge (particle) and topological charge (soliton) have the same ontology. Several notable physicists underlined the implications of duality:

However, this argument bears little consequence to the reality of string theory as a whole, and perhaps a better perspective might quest for the implications of the AdS/CFT correspondence, and such deep mathematical connections as Monstrous moonshine. In view, of the fact that experimentally tested evidence bears no resemblance to the String theory landscape; where philosophically an Anthropic principle is at its strongest a self-justification for any unprovable theory.

Notes

References

Further reading 
Academic papers

 
 
 
 

Books

 

Gauge theories
Duality theories